Microthylax is a genus of beetles in the family Cicindelidae, containing the following species:

 Microthylax olivaceus (Chaudoir, 1854)
 Microthylax schaefferi (W. Horn, 1903)
 Microthylax sinaloae (Bates, 1890)

References

Cicindelidae